Ned Hender was an Australian rules footballer from South Australia. He played for the Port Adelaide Football Club during the 1930s, winning three South Australian National Football League (SANFL) premierships in 1936, 1937 and 1939. After 1940 he played for the Glenelg Football Club, captaining the temporarily merged West Adelaide–Glenelg side in 1942. He also captained Port Adelaide and the South Australian side in 1938.

References

External links

Australian rules footballers from South Australia
Port Adelaide Football Club (SANFL) players
Port Adelaide Football Club players (all competitions)
South Australian Football Hall of Fame inductees
Glenelg Football Club players
Year of birth missing
Year of death missing